Rescassa is a hamlet near Mevagissey in Cornwall, England.

References

Hamlets in Cornwall